The 60th Annual Tony Awards were held at Radio City Music Hall on June 11, 2006. The award ceremony was broadcast live on the CBS television network in the United States. The 2006 Tony Awards did not feature a host, but instead over 60 stars presented awards at the ceremony.

The biggest winner of the night was the Royal National Theatre production The History Boys by British playwright Alan Bennett winning six Tonys out of seven nominations, including Best Play, Best Direction, Best Leading Actor and Best Featured Actress.

Natasha Richardson, Phylicia Rashad and Liev Schreiber announced the nominations on May 16, 2006.

The Antoinette Perry Awards for Excellence in Theatre, more commonly known as the Tony Awards, recognize achievement in live American theatre and are presented by the American Theatre Wing and the League of American Theatres and Producers (now called The Broadway League) at an annual ceremony in New York City. The awards are for Broadway productions and performances plus several non-competitive Special Awards (such as the Regional Theatre Award).

The ceremony
Harry Connick Jr. opened the show singing three popular songs from three Broadway musicals. Connick, (who was heavily medicated to be able to perform, because of a ruptured disc in his spine,), was also a nominee and a performer with the cast of The Pajama Game. All of the sixty presenters and co-hosts joined the stage during the third song. Connick performed "Tonight" (from West Side Story), "Give My Regards to Broadway" (from Little Johnny Jones), and "There's No Business Like Show Business" (from Annie Get Your Gun).

Performances

New Musicals

The Color Purple: Felicia P. Fields, La Chanze and the company performed "Hell No!" and the reprise of the title song.
The Drowsy Chaperone: Sutton Foster and Bob Martin performed "Show Off" with the ensemble.
Jersey Boys: John Lloyd Young performed "Can't Take My Eyes Off of You" and was joined by Christian Hoff, Daniel Reichard and J. Robert Spencer to perform "Who Loves You?".
The Wedding Singer: Stephen Lynch and the company performed "It's Your Wedding Day".

Revivals

The Pajama Game: Harry Connick Jr. and Kelli O'Hara performed "There Once Was a Man". Harry Connick, Jr. and Megan Lawrence with ensemble performed "Hernando's Hideaway".
Sweeney Todd: The company, including Manoel Felciano, Michael Cerveris and Patti LuPone performed a medley of "The Ballad of Sweeney Todd", "The Worst Pies in London", "My Friends" and "The Ballad of Sweeney Todd (reprise)"
The Threepenny Opera: Alan Cumming and Cyndi Lauper with the ensemble performed "The Ballad of the Pimp."

Presenters
Source: tonyawards.com

Lauren Ambrose
Julie Andrews
Hank Azaria
Harry Belafonte
Kristen Bell
Norbert Leo Butz
Victoria Clark
Glenn Close
Harry Connick, Jr.
Barbara Cook
Jim Dale
Christine Ebersole
Ralph Fiennes
Harvey Fierstein
Ana Gasteyer
Joanna Gleason
Marcia Gay Harden
Neil Patrick Harris
Hal Holbrook
Bill Irwin
James Earl Jones
T. R. Knight
Frank Langella
Josh Lucas
Julianna Margulies
Eric McCormack
Audra McDonald
Michael McKean
S. Epatha Merkerson
Brian Stokes Mitchell
James Naughton
Patricia Neal
Bebe Neuwirth
Cynthia Nixon
Janis Paige
Anna Paquin
Rosie Perez
Joe Pesci
Bernadette Peters
David Hyde Pierce
Oliver Platt
Jonathan Pryce
Sara Ramirez
Molly Ringwald
Chita Rivera
Paul Rudd
Mark Ruffalo
Julia Roberts
Liev Schreiber
Kyra Sedgwick
Paul Shaffer
Martin Short
Tom Skerritt
Jamie-Lynn Sigler
John Tartaglia
Richard Thomas
Stanley Tucci
Rita Wilson
Oprah Winfrey
Alfre Woodard

New category
Beginning with the 2006 awards, an additional category was added on a trial basis for the 2005–2006, 2006–2007 and 2007–2008 seasons: Best Recreation of a Leading Role by an Actor/Actress. This category was intended to honor actors and actresses who were cast as replacements and joined a long-running show after its official opening, and would not have otherwise had the chance to be recognized for a potentially Tony-worthy performance.  This award may or may not have been given in any particular year. Shows were to submit replacements they deemed worthy of consideration and a twenty-four-member committee, The Tony Awards Administration Committee, were to attend the shows and evaluate the performances.

No award was given in 2006, because neither of the two performers nominated, Jonathan Pryce and Harvey Fierstein, received the necessary sixteen votes for a win.

Following the 2006 Tony Awards, the Administration Committee voted unanimously to abandon the category.

Winners and nominees
Sources:PlaybillNew York Times

Winners are in bold

Special awards
 Special Tony Award
 Sarah Jones for Bridge & Tunnel
 Regional Theater Tony Award
 Intiman Theatre, Seattle, Washington
 Special Tony Award for Lifetime Achievement in the Theatre
 Harold Prince

Multiple nominations and awards

These productions had multiple nominations:

13 nominations: The Drowsy Chaperone 
11 nominations: The Color Purple 
9 nominations: The Pajama Game
8 nominations: Awake and Sing! & Jersey Boys 
7 nominations: The History Boys
6 nominations: Sweeney Todd 
5 nominations: The Lieutenant of Inishmore, Rabbit Hole & The Wedding Singer
4 nominations: The Constant Wife & Faith Healer 
2 nominations: Lestat, Seascape, Shining City, Three Days of Rain, The Threepenny Opera & Well

The following productions received multiple awards.

6 wins: The History Boys
5 wins: The Drowsy Chaperone  
4 wins: Jersey Boys
2 wins: Awake and Sing!, The Pajama Game & Sweeney Todd

See also
 Drama Desk Awards
 2006 Laurence Olivier Awards – equivalent awards for West End theatre productions
 Obie Award
 New York Drama Critics' Circle
 Theatre World Award
 Lucille Lortel Awards

References

External links
Tony Awards official site
 60th Annual Tony Awards: Meet The Nominees

Tony Awards ceremonies
2006 theatre awards
2006 awards in the United States
2006 in New York City
2000s in Manhattan
Television shows directed by Glenn Weiss